The third annual 2008 Zurich Film Festival ran from September 25 to October 5, 2008. Actor Peter Fonda will act as prexy of the feature film jury.  The festival introduced a new section this year, Panorama D, dedicated to German-language film from Germany, Austria and Switzerland. The showcase opened with the Nicolette Krebitz-directed psychological drama . 

Highlights of the festival included Toronto and Venice Film Festival hits such as the Coen brothers' Burn After Reading, and the psychological Iraq war thriller, The Hurt Locker directed by Kathryn Bigelow, as well as Religulous, featuring Bill Maher and lensed by Larry Charles. Also screening is a documentary about filmmaker Roman Polanski directed by Marina Zenovich, Roman Polanski: Wanted and Desired.  Two films at the festival featured the work of actor Ben Kingsley, Elegy directed by Isabel Coixet and The Wackness helmed by Jonathan Levine.

Festival Hits & Features: Out of Competition

Blindness - directed by Fernando Meirelles
The Boy in the Striped Pyjamas  - directed by Mark Herman
Burn After Reading - directed by the Coen brothers
Cloud 9 - directed by Andreas Dresen 
Crouching Tiger, Hidden Dragon (2000) directed by Ang Lee
Eagle Eye - directed by D.J. Caruso
Elegy - directed by Isabel Coixet 
The Hurt Locker - directed by Kathryn Bigelow
Nights in Rodanthe - directed by George C. Wolfe
Paris, Paris - directed by Christophe Barratier
Religulous - directed by Larry Charles

In Competition: Fiction

Ballast directed by Lance Hammer
Before the Fall directed by F. Javier Gutierrez
Blood Appears - directed by Pablo Fendrik
Boogie - directed by Radu Muntean
Boy of Pigs directed by  William Sten Olsson 
  - directed by Tom Schreiber 
Dunya & Desie - directed by Dana Nechushtan
For a Moment, Freedom directed by Arash T. Riahi 
Jerusalema - directed by Ralph Ziman 
The Man Who Loved Yngve directed by Stian Kristiansen
Moscow, Belgium directed by Christophe van Rompaey
Sell Out! directed by Yeo Joon Han
A Thousand Oceans - directed by Luki Frieden
Tulpan directed by Sergey Dvortsevoy
The Wackness - directed by Jonathan Levine
The World Is Big and Salvation Lurks Around the Corner directed by Stephan Komandarev

In Competition: Documentary

Brides of Allah - directed by Natalie Assouline
My Life Inside - directed by Lucia Gaja
The Flower Bridge - directed by Thomas Ciulei
Suddenly, Last Winter - directed by Gustav Hofer & Luca Ragazzi
Blind Loves - directed by Juraj Lehotsky 
The Art Star and the Sudanese Twins - directed by Pietra Brettkelly 
Roman Polanski: Wanted and Desired - directed by Marina Zenovich
Mr. Rakowski - directed by Jan Diederen

Jury

Peter Fonda - head jurist
Michael Dougherty
Stephen Nemeth
Claudia Puig
Herve Schneid
Dror Shaul
Andrea Staka

Documentary Jury:

Christian Frei
Walter Huegli
Lorna Tee

References

External links
 Zurich Film Festival web site

Film festivals in Switzerland
2008 film festivals
2008 festivals in Europe